Andrea Hlaváčková and Lucie Hradecká were the defending champions, but they lost in the first round to Gabriela Dabrowski and Alla Kudryavtseva.
Kristina Mladenovic and Galina Voskoboeva won the title, defeating Sofia Arvidsson and Johanna Larsson in the final, 7–6(7–5), 6–3.

Seeds

Draw

Draw

References
 Main Draw

U.S. National Indoor Tennis Championships - Doubles
2013 Women's Doubles
U.S. National Indoor Tennis Championships